Live in Allentown is a live performance album by Borbetomagus, released in 1985 by Agaric Records.

Track listing

Personnel 
Adapted from Live in Allentown liner notes.

Borbetomagus
 Don Dietrich – saxophone
 Donald Miller – electric guitar
 Adam Nodelman – bass guitar
 Jim Sauter – saxophone

Production and additional personnel
 Scott Legath – engineering
 Kenn Michael – photography
 Masahiko Ohno – cover art

Release history

References

External links 
 

1985 live albums
Borbetomagus albums